Nise may refer to:

Geography
Nice, France
Nise, Nigeria

Art and literature
Nise: The Heart of Madness, a 2015 Brazilian film
Nise da Silveira, Brazilian psychologist and subject of the film
Nise daigakusei, a 1960 Japanese drama film
Nise Murasaki inaka Genji, an ancient Japanese text
Nise-e, a style of Japanese portrait

Other uses
Pyrisitia nise, a butterfly
Nise Tablet, a pain medication

See also
Nice (disambiguation)
Nais (disambiguation)
Gneiss, a type of metamorphic rock